Introduction is a 2021 South Korean drama film written and directed by Hong Sang-soo. The film stars Shin Seok-ho, Park Mi-so and Kim Min-hee.

The film had its worldwide premiere at the 71st Berlin International Film Festival in March 2021, where it won the Silver Bear for Best Screenplay. It was released theatrically in South Korea on May 27, 2021.

Cast
The cast include:
 Shin Seokho as Youngho
 Park Miso as Juwon
 Kim Young-ho as Father
 Gi Ju-bong
 Joo-Bong Ki as Old Actor
 Young-hwa Seo as Juwon's Mother
 Kim Min-hee as Painter
 Cho Yoon-hee as Youngho's Mother
 Ji-won Ye as Nurse
 Ha Seongguk as Youngho's Friend Jeongsoo

Release
On February 11, 2021, Berlinale announced that the film would have its worldwide premiere at the 71st Berlin International Film Festival in the Berlinale Competition section, in March 2021.

The film was selected for screening in 'View of the World' category at 11th Beijing International Film Festival held from 21 to 29 September, 2021. It is also selected for screening in 'Icon' category at 26th Busan International Film Festival held from 6 to 15 October, 2021.

Reception
Introduction was ranked eighth on Cahiers du Cinémas top 10 films of 2022 list.

Awards and nominations

References

External links
 
 
 

2021 films
South Korean drama films
South Korean black-and-white films
Films directed by Hong Sang-soo